Delaware Township, Ohio, may refer to:

Delaware Township, Defiance County, Ohio
Delaware Township, Delaware County, Ohio
Delaware Township, Hancock County, Ohio

Ohio township disambiguation pages